Emeka a biography by English writer Frederick Forsyth about his friend Colonel Chukwuemeka Odumegwu Ojukwu, head of the state of Biafra, a republic that seceded from Nigeria and was briefly independent. The book was published in 1982. In 1991 a revised edition was published.

"Emeka" is an abbreviation of the Igbo name "Chukwuemeka" (meaning "God has done so much").

References

Works by Frederick Forsyth
Biographies about politicians
Biafra
1982 non-fiction books